Hamed Aghaei is an Iranian football forward, who currently plays for Iranian football club Oxin Alborz in the Azadegan League. He can also play in both center back and left back positions.

Club career

Persepolis F.C.
Aghaei joined Persepolis in summer 2016 with a contract until 2019.

Naft Tehran
Aghaei Loand Naft Tehran until end season.

Club career statistics

References

External links 
 Hamed Aghaei on Instagram
 Hamed Aghaei at Soccerway

1997 births
Living people
Iranian footballers
Sportspeople from Tehran
Persepolis F.C. players
Association football forwards